Lastimosa is a surname. Notable people with the surname include:

 Carlo Lastimosa (born 1990), Filipino basketball player
 Jojo Lastimosa (born 1964), Filipino basketball player
 Leo Lastimosa (born 1964), Filipino journalist
 Mary Jean Lastimosa (born 1987), winner of Binibining Pilipinas 2014